A Damaged Mirror is a 2014 "novelized" memoir by Yael Shahar and Ovadya ben Malka. The book explores the moral dilemmas of a former member of the Birkenau Sonderkommando, Ovadya ben Malka. The book was reissued in 2015 with a new Foreword by Rabbi Nathan Lopes Cardozo.

Plot summary
The book opens with Yael reaching out to a rabbi for a rabbinic judgement for “Alex”. In subsequent correspondence with the rabbi, Rav Ish-Shalom, we learn that Alex's real name is Ovadya. He was deported to Birkenau from his home in Salonika, Greece at the age of 17. His mother and sister were gassed on arrival and Ovadya was sent to the Sonderkommando, the group of prisoners responsible for running the machinery of murder.

Ovadya wants the rabbi to serve as a rabbinic judge—essentially to put himself on trial for what he did in Birkenau. “The fact that good people can be forced to do wrong doesn’t make them less good,” he says. “But it also doesn’t make the wrong less wrong.” However, he is unable to speak of what he did to survive, and his past is gradually revealed in a series of letters to the rabbi and to Masha, a woman who was forced into prostitution during the war. He is able to tell her what he cannot speak aloud.

Yael, born two decades later in America, has no connection with Ovadya, and yet she haunted by a mysterious memory of something she could not have lived.  In an attempt to understand the source of these memories, she sets out on a quest to Europe and eventually Israel. Her quest to learn what and how she remembers is bound up with Ovadya’s search for forgiveness and atonement. She too is unable to speak of the harrowing glimpses revealed by memory, but Ovadya holds the key to fitting the pieces together.

The second half of the book follows Ovadya in his spiritual quest, under the guidance of Rav Ish-Shalom. The rabbi sets him the task of bearing witness for those who perished in the gas chambers, but, scarred by the memory, Ovadya is reluctant to tell what he saw. Little by little, his memory returns, and he finds that he had suppressed even the good memories of his childhood in Salonika. Eventually, a breakthrough occurs and he is able to do what is required by Jewish Law—to journey back to Birkenau and make a formal confession to the souls of those he feels that he has wronged.

Backstory 
On July 7, 2010, B'Sod Siach an online Hebrew-language newsletter, carried a write-up of a viddui—a ritual confession—from beyond the grave. A group of twenty young graduates from a teachers’ college in England had served as witnesses to the last will and testament of Ovadya ben Malka—one of the prisoners forced to operate the machinery of death. This episode, as told from the author's point of view, forms a key chapter of A Damaged Mirror.

References

External links
"Peering into A Damaged Mirror: A trauma therapist explains the psychological impact of the dilemmas faced by the Sonderkommando". Review on Times of Israel.
Review on Ramblings in Jewish History
Publisher site
Reader's Guide and Selections for Book Clubs.
Foreword by Rabbi Nathan Lopes Cardozo.
Jewish Press "Of the Book" Review
Interview with author Yael Shahar
 The Story of Shmuel the Glazier, as told to Ovadya ben Malka. Accidental Talmudist

2014 American novels
Memoirs of imprisonment
World War II memoirs